Gorenja Vas pri Mokronogu is a small settlement just west of Mokronog in the Municipality of Mokronog-Trebelno in southeastern Slovenia. The municipality is included in the Southeast Slovenia Statistical Region and was traditionally part of Lower Carniola.

Name
The name of the settlement was changed from Gorenja vas to Gorenja vas pri Mokronogu in 1953.

References

External links

Gorenja Vas pri Mokronogu on Geopedia

Populated places in the Municipality of Mokronog-Trebelno